Marie Gahéry (1867–1932) was a French Catholic social worker and educationalist. Gahéry was the founder of the Union familiale, an organisation that provided nursery education for the children of working-class families, and of the Œuvre sociale de Popincourt in the 11th arrondissement of Paris, a first attempt in France to found something along the lines of the social settlements of Britain and the United States.

References

1867 births
1932 deaths
French Roman Catholics
French social workers
French educational theorists